Fernando Andrés Gamboa (born 28 October 1970 in Marcos Juárez, Córdoba) is an Argentine football manager and former player who played as a defender.

Playing career
Gamboa started his playing career in 1988 with Newell's Old Boys where he won two league championships.

In 1991, he was part of the Argentina squad that won the Copa América 1991

He joined River Plate in 1993, and after 12 league games in the 1993–94 season he moved to Boca Juniors.

Between 1996 and 1999 Gamboa played for Oviedo in Spain, before returning for a second spell with Newell's Old Boys.

Towards the end of his career he played for Chacarita Juniors and Argentinos Juniors in Argentina, Colo-Colo in Chile and Grasshoppers Zurich of Switzerland.

Coaching career
Gamboa started his managerial career coaching Newell's Old Boys. In 2009 replaced Ricardo Zielinski in Chacarita Juniors signing until June 2010 and assisted Ricardo Lunari. However, they were sacked before the end of their contract. In May 2010 he signed for CD Veracruz of the Mexican second division. In September 2010 Gamboa agreed to replace Antonio Mohamed as head coach of Colón. The board of directors of Colon sacked him soon after the club lost 2–0 against Olimpo in a league match on 9 April 2011.

On 18 April 2018, Gamboa was appointed as the manager of Club Agropecuario Argentino. He left the club one month later. On 6 November 2018, he was then appointed as the manager of Paraguayan club Club Nacional. After the elimination in the first phase of the Copa Libertadores of 2019, he was fired on 31 January 2019.

Honours

Club
 Newell's Old Boys
Primera División Argentina: 1990–91, Clausura 1992

 River Plate
Primera División Argentina: Clausura 1993

 Grasshoppers Zurich
Swiss Super League: 2002–03

International
 Argentina
Copa América: 1991

References

External links
 
 Managerial statistics in the Argentine Primera 

1970 births
Living people
Sportspeople from Córdoba Province, Argentina
Argentine footballers
Argentine expatriate footballers
Argentine expatriate sportspeople in Spain
Argentina international footballers
Argentina under-20 international footballers
Argentina youth international footballers
Association football defenders
Newell's Old Boys footballers
Club Atlético River Plate footballers
Boca Juniors footballers
Chacarita Juniors footballers
Argentinos Juniors footballers
Grasshopper Club Zürich players
Real Oviedo players
Colo-Colo footballers
Expatriate footballers in Chile
Expatriate footballers in Spain
Expatriate footballers in Switzerland
Expatriate football managers in Chile
Chilean Primera División players
Argentine Primera División players
La Liga players
Swiss Super League players
1991 Copa América players
Argentine football managers
Newell's Old Boys managers
Chacarita Juniors managers
Club Agropecuario Argentino managers
Club Atlético Colón managers
Copa América-winning players
Club Nacional managers